Pukaqucha (Quechua: puka red, qucha lake, "red lake", also spelled Puca Ccocha, Puca Jocha, Puca Khocha, Puca Qocha, Puca Q'ocha, Pucaccocha, Pucacocha, Pucajocha) may refer to:

Lakes 
 Pukaqucha (Ayacucho), in the Ayacucho Region, Peru 
 Pukaqucha (Huaylas), in the Huaylas Province, Ancash Region, Peru
 Pukaqucha (Lima), in the Lima Region, Peru
 Pukaqucha (Ocongate), in the Cusco Region, Peru  
 Pukaqucha (Puno), in the Puno Region, Peru

Mountains 
 Pukaqucha (Ancash), in the Ancash Region, Peru
 Pukaqucha (Calca), in the Calca District, Calca Province, Cusco Region, Peru
 Pukaqucha (Junín-Lima), a mountain near a little lake of that name on the border of the Junín Region and the Lima Region, Peru 
 Pukaqucha (Lares), in the Lares District, Calca Province, Cusco Region, Peru
 Pukaqucha (Marcapata), in the Marcapata District, Quispicanchi Province, Cusco Region, Peru